"The Teacher" is a song by Scottish rock band Big Country, which was released in 1986 as the second single from their third studio album The Seer. It was written by Stuart Adamson and produced by Robin Millar. "The Teacher" reached No. 28 in the UK, and No. 14 in Ireland. A music video was filmed to promote the single.

Critical reception
Upon release, Duncan Wright of Smash Hits commented: "Another very Scottish guitar anthem, monstrously epic and a definite case of Adamson taking himself too seriously once again. Big Country sound as though they've just wheeled out another ode to their own majestic tediousness." In a review of one of the band's 1986 concerts in Los Angeles, Sharon Liveten of Billboard stated: "Live, "The Teacher" was transformed from a typical, anthemic, Scottish-sounding Big Country tune into a melange of psychedelic/metal/folk guitars."

Track listing
7" single
"The Teacher" - 4:07
"Home Came the Angels" - 2:27

12" single
"The Teacher (Mystery Mix)" - 5:40
"Home Came the Angels" - 2:27
"The Teacher (7" Mix)" - 4:07

12" single (UK release)
"The Teacher (Mystery Mix)" - 5:40
"Restless Natives The Soundtrack Part 2" - 18:08

Chart performance

Personnel
Big Country
Stuart Adamson - vocals, guitar
Bruce Watson - guitar
Tony Butler - bass, backing vocals
Mark Brzezicki - drums, percussion, backing vocals

Production
Robin Millar - producer of "The Teacher"
Walter Turbitt - additional production and mixing on "The Teacher" and "The Teacher (Mystery Mix)"
Geoff Emerick - producer of "Home Came the Angels" and "Restless Natives The Soundtrack Part 2"

References

1986 songs
1986 singles
Mercury Records singles
Big Country songs
Songs written by Stuart Adamson